The Reno Events Center is a 7,000-seat multi-purpose arena, located in downtown Reno, Nevada, that was constructed in January 2005.

It was the home to the Reno Bighorns of the NBA G League from 2008 to 2018 and to the Reno Barons of the Western Indoor Football Association during their short lived 2011 season.

Along with being a basketball and indoor football venue, it hosts boxing matches and concerts by a wide range of artists.

In 2012 and 2013, the Events Center hosted the NBA D-League Showcase, featuring all of the NBA Development League's teams over a four-day period in early January.

It has also hosted tour stops on the PBR's Built Ford Tough Series.

From 2016 to 2019, the arena hosted the Big Sky men's and women's basketball tournament.

In 2019, the arena was the home of the Reno Express of the new American West Football Conference.

References

External links
 

Basketball venues in Nevada
Boxing venues in Nevada
Defunct NBA G League venues
Indoor arenas in Nevada
Indoor ice hockey venues in the United States
Mixed martial arts venues in Nevada
Reno Bighorns
Sports venues completed in 2005
Sports venues in Reno, Nevada